Yaima Velázquez (born 7 April 1987) is a Cuban rower. She competed at the 2008 Summer Olympics and the 2012 Summer Olympics.

References

External links
 

1987 births
Living people
Cuban female rowers
Olympic rowers of Cuba
Rowers at the 2008 Summer Olympics
Rowers at the 2012 Summer Olympics
Sportspeople from Camagüey
Pan American Games medalists in rowing
Pan American Games gold medalists for Cuba
Pan American Games silver medalists for Cuba
Pan American Games bronze medalists for Cuba
Rowers at the 2007 Pan American Games
Rowers at the 2011 Pan American Games
Medalists at the 2007 Pan American Games
Medalists at the 2011 Pan American Games
21st-century Cuban women